The chapters of Bakuman, a Japanese manga series, are written by Tsugumi Ohba and illustrated by Takeshi Obata. Bakuman has been serialized in the shōnen manga magazine Weekly Shōnen Jump by Shueisha since its premiere on August 11, 2008. The series follows accomplished artist Moritaka Mashiro and aspiring writer Akito Takagi, two boys in ninth grade who wish to be manga creators.

Since its premiere, more than one hundred chapters have been released in Japan. The individual tankōbon are released by Shueisha. The first volume of Bakuman was released on January 5, 2009, and the series has currently finished in Japan with the twentieth and final volume released in July 2012.

The chapters were also released for a limited time in English, German and French on the Jumpland Manga Online website starting on August 19, 2008, and were available until August 31, 2009. Bakuman is the first manga released online by Shueisha in multiple languages before becoming available in print outside Japan. The series has also been released in Korea by Daiwon C.I. and serialized in their Comic Champ manhwa magazine. The series is available in North America from Viz Media.



Volume list

References 

Bakuman
Bakuman